Jiří Doležal (born July 8, 1985) is a Czech professional ice hockey forward who currently plays for HC Slavia Praha of the Czech Extraliga.

Doležal previously played for HC Baník Most. His father Jiří Sr and younger brother Tomáš were also professional hockey players (both played for Slavia Praha).

References

External links 
 
 

1985 births
Living people
Czech ice hockey forwards
HC Litvínov players
HC Karlovy Vary players
HC Slavia Praha players
HC Most players
Ice hockey people from Prague